Mohammad Azam Khan (born 14 August 1948) is an Indian politician who has served as the Member of Parliament from Rampur. He is one of the founding members of the Samajwadi Party and was a member of the Seventeenth Legislative Assembly of Uttar Pradesh. He was also the senior most Cabinet Minister in the Government of Uttar Pradesh and has been a member of the legislative assembly for ten terms from Rampur assembly constituency.

Life and education
Azam Khan was born in Rampur, Uttar Pradesh, India to Mumtaz Khan. He attended Aligarh Muslim University and attained Bachelor of Laws degree in 1974. Khan married Tazeen Fatma in 1981 and has two sons. Prior to entering politics, he worked as a lawyer. His son Abdullah Azam Khan was an MLA from Suar from 2017 to 2019.

Political career
Azam Khan has been an MLA for ten terms; all from Rampur assembly constituency. He was also a cabinet minister in the government of Uttar Pradesh. Khan is currently a member of the Samajwadi Party but has been a member of four other political parties between 1980 and 1992. During his first term (8th Legislative Assembly of Uttar Pradesh), he was a member of Janata Party (Secular). During his second term (9th Legislative Assembly of Uttar Pradesh), he was a member of the Lok Dal. Khan was a member of Janata Dal during his third term (10th Legislative Assembly of Uttar Pradesh). In his fourth term (11th Legislative Assembly of Uttar Pradesh), Azam Khan was a member of Samajwadi Janata Party. Since 1993 (his fifth term and 12th Legislative Assembly of Uttar Pradesh), he has been a member of the Samajwadi Party.

Azam Khan also was a post holder in Samajwadi Party however on 17 May 2009 he resigned from the general secretary post of the party. However, during the 15th Loksabha elections, his opposition to the Samajwadi Party candidate, Jaya Prada, and the surrounding controversies resulted in a crisis in the party, and on 24 May 2009, he claimed to have been expelled for six years although the party chief claimed he himself resigned. The Samajwadi Party later revoked his expulsion and he rejoined on 4 December 2010. After his successful win in 2014, Khan has been given ticket from Rampur constituency by the Samajwadi Party for the Lok Sabha elections of 2019.

Legal cases 
Khan has 80 legal cases against him  related to land encroachment and criminal intimidation registered against him.

Rampur SP Ajay Pal Singh has been investigating one of the cases of land acquisition. There are several cases of land grab registered against the NGO ‘Jauhar Trust’ founded by Khan.

In January 2019, a case of forgery was lodged against Khan, his wife Tazeen Fatma and son with respect to the birth certificate of his son Abdullah at a local police station in Uttar Pradesh. However in March 2019, the Allahabad High Court stayed their arrest until the probe was completed by the police. Khan was supported by party leader Akhilesh Yadav who claimed the cases were politically motivated, however in January 2020, the court declared the three, Abdullah and his parents, to be absconders for failing to appear in the court during case hearings. Following this, the Enforcement Directorate will be attaching the properties of Khan from the first week of February onward. On 26 February 2020, Khan was sentenced to imprisonment along with his wife and son for forging a fake birth certificate for his son. The Supreme Court granted interim bail on 19 May 2022 in an alleged cheating case. The interim bail will continue till his regular bail plea is decided, clearing the way for his release.

Positions held

See also
Mohammad Ali Jauhar University
Rampur
Government of Uttar Pradesh
Sixteenth Legislative Assembly of Uttar Pradesh
Uttar Pradesh Legislative Assembly

References 

|-

1948 births
Indian Muslims
Islam-related controversies
Leaders of the Opposition in the Uttar Pradesh Legislative Assembly
Living people
People from Rampur, Uttar Pradesh
Janata Dal politicians
Janata Party politicians
Janata Party (Secular) politicians
Bharatiya Lok Dal politicians
Samajwadi Party politicians
State cabinet ministers of Uttar Pradesh
Uttar Pradesh MLAs 1980–1985
Uttar Pradesh MLAs 1985–1989
Uttar Pradesh MLAs 1989–1991
Uttar Pradesh MLAs 1991–1993
Uttar Pradesh MLAs 1993–1996
Uttar Pradesh MLAs 2002–2007
Uttar Pradesh MLAs 2007–2012
Uttar Pradesh MLAs 2012–2017
Uttar Pradesh MLAs 2017–2022
Uttar Pradesh MLAs 2022–2027
India MPs 2019–present
Aligarh Muslim University alumni